The Muppets' Wizard of Oz is a 2005 musical fantasy television film directed by Kirk R. Thatcher. It is the second film to be made for television in The Muppets franchise. The film stars Ashanti, Jeffrey Tambor, Quentin Tarantino, David Alan Grier, Queen Latifah, Steve Whitmire, Dave Goelz, Bill Barretta, and Eric Jacobson.

A contemporary adaptation of the 1900 novel The Wonderful Wizard of Oz by L. Frank Baum, the story follows young Dorothy Gale, who works in her Aunt Em's diner, but dreams of becoming a singer somewhere beyond her small Kansas town. Swept up by a tornado, in her trailer home with pet prawn Toto, she lands in Oz and embarks on a journey to meet the Wizard who can help make her dreams come true.

Right after The Walt Disney Company bought the rights to the Muppets franchise in 2004, pre-production took place throughout February 2004, and principal photography began seven months later. ABC made several changes after the initial script was written, ultimately deciding to adapt plot elements from Baum's original novel rather than the 1939 Metro-Goldwyn-Mayer Pictures musical film The Wizard of Oz (since the original 1939 film currently owned by Warner Bros. Discovery). The Muppets' Wizard of Oz became a musical, and included five new songs written and composed by Michael Giacchino.

It is the first Muppets film without the involvement of veteran performer Jerry Nelson following his 2004 retirement from physical performing. His characters of Lew Zealand and Floyd Pepper were respectively performed by Bill Barretta and John Kennedy. Barretta also debuts as the new permanent performer of Dr. Teeth, a character originally performed by Jim Henson. The production also marked the feature film debut of Eric Jacobson as the performer of Sam Eagle, a character originally performed by Frank Oz.

The Muppets' Wizard of Oz premiered on April 27, 2005 at the Tribeca Film Festival, and made its television premiere on ABC on May 20, 2005, as the final ABC Movie of the Week. The film received mixed to negative reviews from critics, who felt that the film was too mature for young audiences and that the cameos and popular culture references were unnecessary.

Plot
Dorothy Gale is an orphaned teenage girl living in a trailer park in Kansas with her Aunt Em and Uncle Henry. Her dream of becoming a singer is slim, but when she overhears that the Muppets are looking for a backup singer, Dorothy hurries to the audition and gives them a demo CD. In returning home, the civil defense sirens sound as a tornado is headed for Dorothy's trailer park. When Aunt Em and Uncle Henry run into the county storm shelter for safety, Dorothy hurries back to her family's mobile home to get Toto, her pet prawn. She does not make it out in time, and the two are swept by the tornado across the vast fields of Kansas. When Dorothy climbs out of the wreckage, she finds that Toto can talk and that she is in Munchkinland, part of the vast Land of Oz.

The Munchkins inform Dorothy that the land's ruler the Wizard, has the power to grant her wish of becoming a famous singer. She meets the Good Witch of the North and receives a pair of magic silver slippers from the Wicked Witch of the East, who was killed when Dorothy's trailer fell on her. Dorothy and Toto embark on a journey on the yellow brick road to meet the Wizard of Oz.

On her journey, she meets a Scarecrow, a Tin Thing, and a Cowardly Lion. They are also seeking the Wizard of Oz to give them a brain, heart, and courage, respectively. The group meets various obstacles before arriving at the Emerald City and meeting the Wizard. Before he grants their wishes, the Wizard sends Dorothy and her friends to retrieve the Wicked Witch of the West's magic eye, a tool she uses to see anything she desires in the Land of Oz.

The Wicked Witch of the West sees them coming and sends the Flying Monkeys to deal with them. The Witch and the Flying Monkeys capture Dorothy, Toto and Lion while Scarecrow and Tin Thing are dismantled. Toto calls the Munchkins, who set him and Dorothy free and hold up the witch. Dorothy kicks the witch into her own "bottled water bath," which contains tap water (to which she is severely allergic). This causes the Wicked Witch of the West to melt. Dorothy finds the magic eye floating in the tub unharmed and grabs it.

Dorothy gains control of the Flying Monkeys and has them rebuild Scarecrow and Tin Thing. Then she and her friends travel back to the Emerald City to have their wishes granted. When they all storm into the Wizard's room, they discover it is merely a Hollywood effects stage and that the Wizard is just an ordinary man. He asked for the witch's eye so that she could not see him for who he really was. Even so, he still proceeds to grant their wishes. Dorothy finally becomes a singer in the Land of Oz, but realizes that all she ever really wanted was to go back home and be with her family. After traveling back to Munchkinland, she meets Glinda the Good Witch of the South, who tells her that by clicking her heels together three times, she will be able to go anywhere she desires. Saying "take me home to Aunt Em", Dorothy is spun by the slippers' magic into Kansas and finds out that she has been chosen to sing with the Muppets.

Cast
 Ashanti as Dorothy Gale: A Kansas teen dreaming of leaving her home and becoming a singer.
 Queen Latifah as Aunt Em: Dorothy's aunt and co-owner of the family diner in Kansas.
 David Alan Grier as Uncle Henry: Dorothy's uncle and co-owner of the family diner.
 Jeffrey Tambor as The Wizard of Oz: The legendary Wizard of Oz. This is Tambor's second appearance in a Muppet film, the first being Muppets from Space.
 Quentin Tarantino as himself: In a short appearance with Kermit the Frog, Tarantino discusses violent ideas on how to stop the Wicked Witch of the West.
Extended version
 Kelly Osbourne as post-makeover Dorothy Gale: Appears in a brief cameo as Dorothy when she first comes out of the Magic Makeover Machine in Emerald City.

Muppets performers

 Steve Whitmire as:
 Kermit the Frog as Himself/Scarecrow: A scarecrow in search of a brain. Scarecrow is constantly mocked by the crows in Oz, as he is defenseless and cannot do anything to stop them. Prior to Dorothy's journey, Kermit organizes a talent scout for a star for a new show. After her return, he hires her.
 Beaker: He appears as an Emerald City Technician. Beaker also appears at the end in the Muppets' show.
 Rizzo the Rat as Himself/Mayor of Munchkinland. He occasionally aids Dorothy when she is in danger. Prior to Dorothy's journey, Rizzo is seen assisting Bean Bunny in loading equipment into the Muppets' bus. He returns for the Muppets' show in the climax.
 Bean Bunny: Prior to Dorothy's journey, Bean Bunny is seen assisting Rizzo the Rat in loading equipment into the Muppets' bus. 
 Statler as Kalidah Critic #1. He heckles Dorothy and her friends as they try to cross a log.
 Dave Goelz as:
 The Great Gonzo as Himself/The Tin Thing: A robot in search of a heart. Originally human, the Tin Thing was turned into a robot by the Wicked Witch of the West who was angry at him for asking to leave her palace and marry his fiancée, Camilla the Chicken. He also appears at the end of the film in the Muppets' show.
 Dr. Bunsen Honeydew: He appears as an Emerald City Technician. He also appears at the end of the film in the Muppets' show.
 Waldorf as Kalidah Critic #2. He and the other Kalidah Critic heckle Dorothy and her friends as they try to cross a log.
 Zoot: He performs backup for the songs "Naptime", and for "The Witch is in the House", and appears at the end of the film in the Muppets' new show.
 Bill Barretta as:
 Pepé the King Prawn as Toto: Dorothy's pet prawn and first companion on her journey. In Kansas, Toto was a prawn that lived in a fish bowl in Dorothy's room.
 Dr. Teeth: He performs "Naptime", and also performs in "The Witch is in the House". He appears again at the end of the film in the Muppets' show.
 Johnny Fiama: He appears as one of the henchmen of the Wicked Witch of the West, and is supposedly her love interest.
 Lew Zealand: He briefly appears in Emerald City at the red carpet event, asking Dorothy to sign his boomerang fish. 
 The Swedish Chef: He provides the Bran Flakes for the Wizard.  
 Bubba the Rat: He assists the Mayor of Munchkin Land in getting Dorothy and the Lion out of Poppyfields.
 Eric Jacobson as:
 Miss Piggy as herself: She appears early on with Kermit, and tries to get rid of Dorothy. She returns at the end of the film for the Muppets' show. She also appears as: 
 The Wicked Witch of the West: The Wicked Witch that terrifies all that meet her.
 Tattypoo the Good Witch of the North: The Good Witch that gives Dorothy the silver slippers.
 Glinda the Good Witch of the South: The other Good Witch that shows Dorothy how to get home.
 The Wicked Witch of the East: The original owner of the magic slippers who was killed by Dorothy's falling mobile home.
 Fozzie Bear as Himself/Cowardly Bear: A nervous and frightened lion stand-up comic that accompanies Dorothy and the others on their journey. Fozzie shows up at the end of the film in the Muppets' show.
 Animal: He performs in the songs "Naptime" and "The Witch is in the House", and appears at the end of the film in the Muppets' new show.
 Sam Eagle: He appears as the Guardian of the Gates.
 Brian Henson as:
 Sal Manilla as Sal, a Flying Monkey: He accompanies Johnny for much of the film.
 Kevin Clash as:
 Clifford: He appears as the manager of the Poppy Field Club. 
 Mulch: He appears briefly in Poppyfields.
 Black Dog as a Flying Monkey
 John Kennedy as:
 Angel Marie as a Flying Monkey: A servant of the Wicked Witch of the West.
 Floyd Pepper: He performs in "Naptime" and "The Witch is in the House", and appears at the end of the film in the Muppets' new show.
 Rickey Boyd as:
 Scooter: He appears as the Wizard's Assistant.
 Crazy Harry as a Flying Monkey
 Tyler Bunch as:
 Janice: She performs in "Naptime" and "The Witch is in the House", and appears at the end of the film in the Muppets' new show.
 Old Tom as a Flying Monkey
 Julianne Buescher as
 Wizard's Green Lady and Chicken Forms
 John Henson as
 Sweetums as a Flying Monkey: He provides the keys for the Cowardly Lion's escape from his cage.
 Mike Quinn as
 Spotted Dick as a Flying Monkey
 Allan Trautman as
 Crow: He bothers the Scarecrow.
 Calico as a Flying Monkey
 Drew Massey as 
 Aretha as a Flying Monkey
 Alice Dinnean as:
 Camilla the Chicken: The Tin Thing's girlfriend. The two are reunited later on in the film.
 Foo-Foo: Foo-Foo appears as the pet of the Wicked Witch of the West.

In addition, Whitmire and Goelz make on-screen cameos as audience members at Aunt Em's Diner during the finale.

Production
When The Walt Disney Company acquired the Muppets franchise from The Jim Henson Company in February 2004, the Muppets were re-introduced to the public by marketing products and guest appearing on television shows such as Good Morning America and America's Funniest Home Videos. After a new film titled The Muppets' Wizard of Oz was announced by The Jim Henson Company, Fox Television Studios, Touchstone Television, and the Muppets Holding Company signed on to help produce it. This was the last Muppets production to be produced by the Jim Henson Company once Disney purchased the rights to the Muppets franchise.

Filming took place throughout September 2004 in Vancouver, British Columbia. Before filming, ABC announced that the production would adapt elements from the original 1900 book, rather than the 1939 film. such as the Silver Shoes instead of the Ruby slippers.  On August 25, 2004, it was announced that Hilary Duff, Jessica Simpson, and Ashanti had auditioned for the role of Dorothy Gale, but Ashanti had won the part. When asked about how she felt about working with the Muppets, Ashanti replied, "I love children, and to me, the Muppets are just like little kids." She also stated, "The director had to give me a few pointers and tips for acting with them, but the most important thing that I learned was to keep eye contact." Also in August 2004, BBC News reported that Quentin Tarantino would appear in the film.

Music
Michael Giacchino, who had previously worked on the video game Muppet Monster Adventure, would become an Academy Award-winning composer. Giacchino worked alongside Jeannie Lurie, Adam Cohen, Debra Frank and Steve L. Hayes to write five original songs for the film: "Kansas", "When I'm with You", "The Witch is in the House", "Nap Time" and "Good Life".

"When I'm with You" was nominated for a Primetime Emmy in the Outstanding Music and Lyrics category, but lost to "Mary Jane/Mary Lane" from Reefer Madness. Ashanti and the Muppet cast, mainly Barretta and Jacobson, contributed the vocals for each of the songs. Ted Kryczko produced the album, Booker T. Washington White prepared the songs for recording, and Paul Silveira and Brandon Christy mixed the songs.

Soundtrack

The Muppets' Wizard of Oz official soundtrack was released on May 17, 2005. The album was an enhanced soundtrack titled Best of Muppets featuring The Muppets' Wizard of Oz as it was not a film-specific soundtrack, but an album featuring the Muppets' best songs from The Muppet Show as well as songs from the film.

Track listing
 "(Gotta Get Outta) Kansas" - Ashanti
 "When I'm With You" – Ashanti, Kermit, Gonzo, Fozzie & Pepe
 "The Witch Is in the House" – Miss Piggy with Dr. Teeth and The Electric Mayhem
 "Calling All Munchkins" – The Munchkin Tap-Your-Knuckles Choir
 "Good Life" – Ashanti
 "Nap Time" – Dr. Teeth and The Electric Mayhem
 "The Muppet Show Theme" – The Muppets
 "Mah Nà Mah Nà" – Mahna Mahna & the Two Snowths
 "Bein' Green" – Kermit the Frog
 "Rainbow Connection" – Kermit & Muppets With Sesame Street Gang 
 "Lady of Spain" – Marvin Suggs & his Muppaphone
 "Halfway Down the Stairs" – Kermit & Robin
 "What Now My Love?" – Miss Piggy
 "Tenderly" – Dr. Teeth and The Electric Mayhem
 "Happy Feet" – Kermit and the Frog Chorus

Release
The Muppets' Wizard of Oz premiered on April 27, 2005 at the Tribeca Film Festival. The television premiere was on May 20, 2005 at 8:00pm on ABC in the US. It aired in Canada on CBC Television, and in the UK on December 18, 2005. In the US, the film's official soundtrack was released on May 17, 2005. Buena Vista Home Entertainment released the DVD and VHS in both the US and in international territories. The film was released to Region 1 DVD and VHS on August 9, 2005. 
The Region 2 DVD was released on April 3, 2006. The film was rated U by the British Board of Film Classification, K-3 in Finland, and G in Australia. The DVD and VHS were released under the title Extended Version in the US and Anniversary Edition outside the US. The extended version contains 20 minutes of footage cut from the feature film, including the footage of the Kelly Osbourne and Quentin Tarantino cameos. The DVD and VHS included an extended interview with Quentin Tarantino, a blooper reel, and a behind-the-scenes look at the film guided by Pepe the Prawn. In the US, the DVD and VHS release of the film was in a 1.33:1 (fullscreen) aspect ratio, whereas the international versions are in the original 1.78:1 (widescreen) aspect ratio. During Macy's annual Flower Show promotion, the store's windows along Broadway displayed flower arrangements illustrating six scenes from the movie, while the store sold The Muppets' Wizard of Oz-related merchandise, such as plush dolls.<ref>"Muppet Wizardry at Macys." License, Vol. 8, Issue 4, p. 11, May 2005. Retrieved: January 17, 2012.</ref>

Critical reception
7.75 million viewers watched The Muppets' Wizard of Oz on its television premiere night in the United States; it ranked as the forty-second most-watched television program of the week. Michael Schneider of Variety wrote that it "performed solidly ... particularly with adults 18–34, teens and kids." The film received negative reviews from critics. At Rotten Tomatoes, the movie currently holds a 38% rating, based on 8 reviews.

For the film's positive response, Kevin Carr stated that "When you dig down and actually find (and watch) the new Muppet material, some of the magic is still there." MaryAnn Johanson of Flick Filosopher said that, "It's not on a par with the Muppet movie madness of old, but it's darn close." According to the Bums Corner's review the film was a "treat for all ages, and that it was a colorful, musical, humorous romp." Keith Allen of Movie Rapture gave the film 2.5 stars out of 3, explaining that the film's humor was surprisingly clever, and that the film would frequently make you laugh. Mutant Reviewers commented that although the Muppet deal with Walt Disney was "disappointing", the film managed to be funny and witty.
 
In contrast, David Nusair of Reel Film Reviews warned that the film was "strictly for kids." Nusair stated that although Ashanti can sing, she cannot act. Joshua Tyler of Cinema Blend explained that Dorothy visiting the Wizard of Oz to become a star instead of going back home was a big mistake, and that it showed how shallow society has become. R.J. Carter of The Trades gave the film a B−, also stating that Dorothy's wish to become a star was a selfish one. Ultimate Disney's review found that the extended DVD version of the film did more harm than good; Andy Dursin of The Aisle Seat said that the original film was "dull" and that the extended version was an improvement. Cold Fusion Video felt that although the film was entertaining, it lacked the heart and wit of Jim Henson's Muppet films. Bryan Pope of DVD Verdict said that the film drained the Muppets of their spirit and was slightly gratuitous. Techtite TV reviews felt that the film was done poorly on all levels, and that the film was on the higher end of TV-PG.

Other reviewers felt that the film's attempt to appeal to an older, more mature audience was ultimately a bad idea. Kerry Bennett of Parent Previews warned that it sometimes steered "dangerously off course" due to an excess of sexual content and violence. Referential humor to the marriage of Jennifer Lopez, Manolo Blahnik style silver shoes, and properties such as Girls Gone Wild, The Passion of the Christ, Apocalypse Now and Kill Bill: Volume 1'' were seen as too mature. Cold Fusion Video judged the Kelly Osbourne cameo in the extended edition as "pointless". Dursin contrasted the two guest appearances and found that the Tarantino cameo dragged the film down. Critics were split on the merits of ABC's modernized adaptation to rely on plot elements from the original novel instead of the iconic 1939 film.

See also
List of television films produced for American Broadcasting Company

References

External links
 

2005 television films
2005 films
Canadian television films
English-language Canadian films
The Muppets films
The Muppets television specials
The Jim Henson Company films
2000s children's fantasy films
American television films
American children's films
2005 soundtrack albums
Walt Disney Records soundtracks
Walt Disney anthology television series episodes
Films based on The Wizard of Oz
Films scored by Michael Giacchino
Canadian musical films
Films directed by Kirk Thatcher
Films about witchcraft
Films set in Kansas
20th Century Fox Television films
20th Century Fox direct-to-video films
Fantasy film soundtracks
2000s American films
2000s Canadian films